Jamda or JAMDA may refer to:

 Jiangda, Nagqu or Jamda, a village and a small township-level in Tibet, China
 Jamda, Mayurbhanj, a village and a block in Orissa, India
Jamda Shahi, a village in Uttar Pradesh, India
 Journal of the American Medical Directors Association, a peer-reviewed medical journal